Thomas Langdon (born 9 June 1994) is a former professional Australian rules footballer who played for the Collingwood Football Club in the Australian Football League (AFL).

State football
Langdon played junior football with Prahran and with Glen Iris Gladiators, in the Yarra Junior Football League. He nominated for the 2012 AFL draft, but wasn't selected. The following season, he was named co-captain of the Sandringham Dragons. In 2013, Langdon played six games in the Victorian Football League (VFL) with Sandringham and was named twice in the best.

AFL career
He was recruited by the Collingwood Football Club with the 65th overall selection in the 2013 AFL draft. He featured in all three senior pre-season games, averaging 15 disposals and 2.3 rebound 50s a game, followed by making his debut in the opening round of the 2014 season, against Fremantle at Etihad Stadium, where he was named as one of the best players despite the 70 point loss, tallying 24 disposals. In the seventh round, Langdon was selected as an AFL Rising Star nominee, following a best on ground performance in Collingwood's 34 point over old rivals Carlton when he collected 23 disposals. After the season, Langdon won the Harry Collier Trophy as Collingwood's Best First Year Player. He was also selected for the 22 Under 22 team, a feat he repeated in 2015. At the end of the 2018 season, both Sydney and Fremantle showed interest in Langdon, hoping to sign him, but in the end he signed a three-year contract extension with Collingwood. In the ninth round of the 2019 season, Langdon injured his knee halfway through Collingwood's 41 point win over St Kilda, Nine weeks later, after trying to rehabilitate, he underwent knee surgery, ruling him out for the rest of the season. A timeframe for his return wasn't determined by the pre-season of the 2020 season, and Langdon considered retirement. After not playing any games during the 2020 season Langdon announced his retirement at the end of November.

Playing style
Langdon can play as a defender or as a midfielder. He has a significant advantage when the ball is in the air due to his balance, game sense, and being able to read the ball in flight. He also has the ability to mark strongly overhead and a fluent kick.

Personal life
Langdon's younger brother, Ed Langdon, plays for Melbourne. Before being drafted to Collingwood, Langdon barracked for Richmond. In 2013, Langdon started studying business arts at Monash University. He is currently studying a Bachelor of Commerce at Deakin University.

Statistics
 Statistics are correct to the end of the 2020 season

|- style="background-color: #eaeaea"
! scope="row" style="text-align:center" | 2014
|  || 41 || 19 || 0 || 2 || 192 || 123 || 315 || 107 || 47 || 0 || 0.1 || 10.1 || 6.5 || 16.6 || 5.6 || 2.5
|-
! scope="row" style="text-align:center" | 2015
|  || 8 || 22 || 0 || 5 || 248 || 213 || 461 || 110 || 70 || 0 || 0.2 || 11.3 || 9.7 || 21.0 || 5.0 || 3.2
|- style="background-color: #eaeaea"
! scope="row" style="text-align:center" | 2016
|  || 8 || 5 || 2 || 1 || 49 || 47 || 96 || 16 || 13 || 0.4 || 0.2 || 9.8 || 9.4 || 19.2 || 3.2 || 2.6
|-
! scope="row" style="text-align:center" | 2017
|  || 8 || 11 || 0 || 1 || 99 || 111 || 210 || 62 || 28 || 0 || 0.1 || 9.0 || 10.1 || 19.1 || 5.6 || 2.5
|- style="background-color: #eaeaea"
! scope="row" style="text-align:center" | 2018
|  || 8 || 23 || 1 || 1 || 229 || 229 || 458 || 130 || 58 || 0.04 || 0.04 || 10.0 || 10.0 || 19.9 || 5.7 || 2.5 
|-
! scope="row" style="text-align:center" | 2019
|  || 8 || 9 || 0 || 1 || 70 || 91 || 161 || 45 || 18 || 0 || 0.1 || 7.8 || 10.1 || 17.9 || 5.0 || 2.0
|- style="background-color: #eaeaea"
! scope="row" style="text-align:center" | 2020
|  || 8 || 0 || — || — || — || — || — || — || — || — || — || — || — || — || — || —
|- class="sortbottom"
! colspan=3| Career
! 89
! 3
! 11
! 887
! 814
! 1701
! 470
! 234
! 0.03
! 0.1
! 10.0
! 9.2
! 19.1
! 5.3
! 2.6
|}

References

External links

1994 births
Living people
Collingwood Football Club players
Australian rules footballers from Victoria (Australia)
Sandringham Dragons players
People educated at Melbourne Grammar School
Sandringham Football Club players